Olivet is a city in Eaton County in the U.S. state of Michigan. The population was 1,605 at the 2010 census. Olivet College is located in the city.

History
From its founding in 1844 through the 1910 census, Olivet was a village within Walton Township.

Geography

Demographics

2010 census
As of the census of 2010, there were 1,605 people, 426 households, and 247 families living in the city. The racial makeup of the city was 89.8% White, 6.8% African American, 0.2% Native American, 0.6% Asian, 0.7% from other races, and 1.9% from two or more races. Hispanic or Latino of any race were 3.1% of the population.

There were 426 households, of which 30.8% had children under the age of 18 living with them, 38.0% were married couples living together, 14.3% had a female householder with no husband present, 5.6% had a male householder with no wife present, and 42.0% were non-families. 26.5% of all households were made up of individuals, and 6.6% had someone living alone who was 65 years of age or older. The average household size was 2.52 and the average family size was 3.04.

The median age in the city was 21.7 years. 15.4% of residents were under the age of 18; 47.7% were between the ages of 18 and 24; 15.9% were from 25 to 44; 15% were from 45 to 64; and 6% were 65 years of age or older. The gender makeup of the city was 52.4% male and 47.6% female.

2000 census
As of the census of 2000, there were 1,758 people, 474 households, and 293 families living in the city. The racial makeup of the city was 84.30% White, 9.61% African American, 1.65% Native American, 1.65% Asian, 0.06% Pacific Islander, 1.76% from other races, and 0.97% from two or more races. Hispanic or Latino of any race were 2.10% of the population.

There were 474 households, out of which 39.2% had children under the age of 18 living with them, 40.1% were married couples living together, 16.9% had a female householder with no husband present, and 38.0% were non-families. 28.1% of all households were made up of individuals, and 6.5% had someone living alone who was 65 years of age or older.  The average household size was 2.58 and the average family size was 3.20.

In the city, the population was spread out, with 22.0% under the age of 18, 41.5% from 18 to 24, 20.3% from 25 to 44, 11.8% from 45 to 64, and 4.5% who were 65 years of age or older.  The median age was 22 years. For every 100 females, there were 102.1 males.  For every 100 females age 18 and over, there were 104.5 males.

The median income for a household in the city was $34,474, and the median income for a family was $40,781. Males had a median income of $30,602 versus $19,904 for females. The per capita income for the city was $11,682.  About 8.0% of families and 10.7% of the population were below the poverty line, including 10.2% of those under age 18 and 5.7% of those age 65 or over.

Education
Olivet College
Olivet Community Schools

References

External links
Official Website of the City of Olivet

Cities in Eaton County, Michigan
Lansing–East Lansing metropolitan area